Anne Against the World is a 1929 American drama film directed by Duke Worne and featuring Boris Karloff.

Cast
 Shirley Mason as Anne
 Jack Mower as John Forbes
 James Bradbury Jr. as Eddie
 Billy Franey
 Isabelle Keith as Teddy
 Belle Stoddard
 Thomas A. Curran as Emmett
 Henry Roquemore as Folmer
 Boris Karloff

References

External links

1929 films
American black-and-white films
1929 drama films
Films directed by Duke Worne
American silent feature films
American drama films
Rayart Pictures films
1920s American films
Silent American drama films